Max King (born 4 May 1997) is a professional rugby league footballer who plays as a  and  for the Canterbury-Bankstown Bulldogs in the NRL.

He previously played for the Gold Coast Titans and the Melbourne Storm in the National Rugby League.

Background
King was born in Huddersfield, England. His great-grandfather, Cec, played for the South Sydney Rabbitohs from 1945 to 1946, his grandfather, Johnny, was a seven-time premiership winner with the St George Dragons and his father, David, played for the Gold Coast Seagulls from 1991 to 1992.  His mother is English.

He lived in Huddersfield until aged 7 when he and his family moved to Australia. He lived in Maitland and was educated at All Saints College, Maitland. It was there where he represented NSW Combined Catholic Colleges Rugby League team. 

King is a West Maitland Wallaroo junior, he was signed by North Sydney Bears Harold Matthews Cup side in 2013 and then Newcastle Knights SG Ball Cup side in 2015, before being signed by the Gold Coast Titans.

Playing career

Early career
In 2016 and 2017, King played for the Gold Coast Titans' NYC team.

2017
In round 3 of the 2017 NRL season, King made his NRL debut for the Gold Coast club against Parramatta.

2018
In round 9 of the 2018 season, King scored his first NRL try in the Gold Coast's 18-32 loss to the Canberra Raiders at Canberra Stadium.

2019
Mid-season saw King traded to the Melbourne Storm. In round 23 of the 2019 season, King made his Melbourne Storm debut against his former club the Gold Coast at AAMI Park. He had his Melbourne jersey (cap number 199) presented to him by former Melbourne player Jason Ryles.

2020
In round 20 of the 2020 NRL season, King played his 50th NRL match, during the match King was placed on report for a hip drop tackle on St. George Illawarra forward Blake Lawrie. Due to the intent shown from King the tackle was referred straight to judiciary.  King was later suspended for three matches by the judiciary costing himself a chance of playing in the 2020 NRL Grand Final.  The tackle was described as being ugly and premeditated.

2021
King missed the entire 2021 NRL season following complications from off-season Achilles tendon surgery. On October 1, it was announced he had signed a one-year deal to join the Canterbury-Bankstown Bulldogs for the 2022 NRL season.

2022
After playing off the interchange bench in the opening seven games of the 2022 season, King made his Canterbury run-on debut in their round 8 match against the West Tigers at Leichhardt Oval. Under interim coach Mick Potter he has consolidated himself in the starting 13, both in the back row and at prop. King played a total of 24 matches for Canterbury in the 2022 NRL season as the club finished 12th on the table.

References

External links
Canterbury-Bankstown Bulldogs profile

1997 births
Living people
Australian rugby league players
Gold Coast Titans players
Melbourne Storm players
Canterbury-Bankstown Bulldogs players
Rugby league players from Newcastle, New South Wales
Rugby league props